APOEL FC is a professional football club founded in 1926 and based in Nicosia, Cyprus. This list has details about APOEL's achievements in major Cypriot and European competitions.

APOEL is the most successful football club in Cyprus with an overall tally of 28 Championships, 21 Cups and 14 Super Cups. Also, they have appeared 42 times in European competitions, qualifying to the UEFA Champions League group stages for the first time in their history during the 2009–10 season. They participated again in the Champions League group stages in the 2011–12 season, qualifying for the quarter-finals of the competition by topping their group and eliminating Lyon in the last 16, becoming the only Cypriot club to reach the UEFA Champions League quarter-finals. APOEL qualified for the third time to the Champions League group stages in the 2014–15 season. They also participated in the group stages of the 2013–14 and 2015–16 UEFA Europa League, managing to reach the last 16 of the competition during the 2016–17 season, when they topped their group and eliminated Athletic Bilbao in the round of 32. APOEL is the only Cypriot club who have reached the group stages (and the knockout stages) of both major UEFA competitions (UEFA Champions League & UEFA Europa League).

Key

Key to league record:
P = Played
W = Games won
D = Games drawn
L = Games lost
F = Goals for
A = Goals against
Pts = Points
Pos = Final position

Key to divisions:
1st = Cypriot First Division
A' Ethniki = Alpha Ethniki (Greece)

Key to rounds:
 X = Competition not held
PR = Preliminary round
Q1 = 1st Qualifying round
Q2 = 2nd Qualifying round
Q3 = 3rd Qualifying round
PO = Play-off round
R1 = Round 1
R2 = Round 2
R3 = Round 3

Grp = Group stage
R32 = Round of 32
R16 = Last 16
QF = Quarter-finals
SF = Semi-finals
RU = Runners-up
W = Winners

Seasons

References

Seasons
 
APOEL